New England Championship Wrestling (NECW) is an independent professional wrestling promotion based in the Northeastern United States that has promoted events since 2000. Currently owned and operated by Sheldon Goldberg, is one of the top independent wrestling promotions in New England. Its roster has included independent wrestlers Antonio "The Promise" Thomas, Slyk Wagner Brown and Rick Fuller. Its women's division, World Women's Wrestling, includes some of the US's most prominent female wrestlers, including Ariel, Sumie Sakai, Alere Little Feather, Riptide, Nikki Roxx, Lexxus, April Hunter, Malia Hosaka and Mercedes Martinez.

World Wrestling Entertainment wrestlers Kofi Kingston, John Cena, Kenny Dykstra, Sasha Banks and R. J. Brewer also competed in the promotion during their early careers. Former WWE announcer and current Ring of Honor announcer Kevin Kelly worked as a booker for the promotion.  Former state senator and current mayor of Weymouth, Massachusetts, Robert Hedlund, served as NECW Commissioner in 2000-2001.

History
Former editor of the Mat Marketplace newsletter, Sheldon Goldberg had been involved with promoters Tony Rumble and Paul Heyman in bringing Michinoku Pro to the United States during the late-1990s. By September 2000, Goldberg himself began holding professional wrestling events in the Boston-area, successfully selling out local venues such as Good Time Emporium in Somerville and the National Guard Armory in Quincy. Over the next several years, the promotion developed a strong following based on its traditional "family-friendly" style of professional wrestling as an alternative to the adult themed sports entertainment adopted by World Wrestling Entertainment.

In 2004, the promotion became the first to produce a weekly wrestling TV show specifically produced for distribution on the Internet through its affiliate NECW.tv website. Its weekly internet broadcasts eventually grew to an average of over 20,000 viewers per week in over 40 countries around the world. Its exposure was further increased through DVD releases of yearly supercards such as the popular Iron 8 Championship Tournament.

In March 2006, New England Championship Wrestling merged with PWF Mayhem and the company operated under the New England Championship Wrestling brand. On August 16, 2006, the merged companies unified their championship titles in an interpromotional event in Quincy, Massachusetts. The event saw PWF Mayhem Tag Team Champions The Canadian Superstars (J-Busta & Dave Cole) defeat The Wild Boys (Billy King & Mike Lynch) for the NECW Unified Tag Team Championship, PWF Mayhem Junior Heavyweight Champion "The Talent" T.J. Richter defeated "Big Guns" Frankie Arion for the NECW Unified Television Championship and PWF Mayhem Heavyweight Champion "The Human Nightmare" Evan Siks defeated D.C. Dillinger for the NECW Undisputed Triple Crown Championship.

Also in March 2006, the company launched World Women's Wrestling, an all-female offshoot of the main NECW promotion.

Following its "Toxic Waltz" event on November 6, 2010, the merged company ceased operations due to a split between founder, Sheldon Goldberg and the PWF faction of Matt West, Kyle White and Roy Rossi. NECW was dormant until May 14, 2011, when the company returned with a benefit show in Carver, MA.  The promotion has returned to active status running regular events mostly throughout the Greater Boston area, while the revived PWF Northeast promotion only lasted until October 2013, when it ceased operations.

Alumni

Officials

Championships

Iron 8 Championship Tournament

The Iron 8 Championship is a trademark annual event hosted by NECW. Eight wrestlers are selected from inside and outside of NECW to compete in four single elimination matches, in which the winners of the four matches would compete in a forty-five-minute ironman match to crown an Iron 8 Champion.  The 2014 winner also became NECW Heavyweight Champion after previous titleholder Slyck Wagner Brown suffered an injury.  The event was not held in 2015.

The Toxic Waltz
The Toxic Waltz is an annual event that originated in PWF Mayhem. The Toxic Waltz is a ten-man gauntlet in which the winner would receive a Triple Crown Championship match at the winter showcase; Genesis. The match begins with two men in the ring, and contrary to a traditional gauntlet, the loser of each fall picks the winners next opponent. The tenth man selected could be anyone in or out of NECW. The last man standing would be the winner.  On November 7, 2010, news began to spread that the 2010 Toxic Waltz would be the last event for NECW.  Therefore, 2010 Toxic Waltz winner "Handsome" Johnny Hayes went on to face "The Real Deal" Brandon Locke for the PWF Northeast Heavyweight Championship after PWF Northeast resumed operations in 2011.  In October 2013, PWF Northeast closed its doors.

Notes
1Arion was the 9th man to lose in the match, but because the man who pinned him ("The Masked Enforcer") revealed himself to be Max Bauer (who wasn't cleared to compete that night), Sheldon Goldberg gave the win to Arion by default.

Tag Team Classic
The "Tag Team Classic" is a one-night, tag team tournament for an NECW Tag Team title shot.  The tournament was introduced on September 19, 2009, at the National Guard Armory in Quincy, MA.

Round 1
-Real Natural (Brandon Locke and Scott Osbourne) defeated Stupefied and Twiggy
-Mike Bennett and Guy Alexander defeated T.J. Richter and Mr. Munroe
-The Red Devil Fight Team (Mikhail Ivanov and Aleksander Chekov) defeated Davey Loomis and Alex Payne
-Ryan Bisbal and Don Vega defeated 2.0 (Shane Matthews and Jagged)

Semi-finals
-Real Natural vs Bennett and Alexander ended in a double-countout.  As a result, the second semi-final match became the tournament finals.

Finals
-Bisbal and Vega defeated The Red Devil Fight Team.

Later in the night, then-NECW Tag Team Champions The Crown Jewels(Bad Boy Jason and Darling Damon) defeated Bisbal and Vega to retain the titles.

A second annual Tag Team Classic tournament was scheduled for September 11, 2010 at the National Guard Armory in Quincy, MA.

Breakthrough Bash
In the spring and Summer of 2010, NECW held the first Breakthrough Bash tournament with the winner getting a spot in the annual Birthday Bash event.

Round 1
-Ray Keijimura defeated "H2O" Ryan Waters and Vinny Marseglia in a 3-way match
-Triplelicious defeated Mr. Mini-Roe
-Matt Magnum defeated Marco Macc
-Vinny Marseglia defeated "H2O" Ryan Waters and Mr. Mini-Roe in a "Last Chance Challenge" 3-way match

Round 2
-Ray Keijimura defeated Triplelicious
-Vinny Marseglia defeated Matt Magnum

Final
-Ray Keijimura defeated Vinny Marseglia

Move to cable TV
On August 9, 2009, at NECW's 9th anniversary show, NECW announced that starting on January 8, 2010, NECW matches will air from 4-5PM on Fridays on Comcast SportsNet New England.  That makes NECW the first pro wrestling promotion on CSNNE since the channel (then Fox Sports Net New England) aired TNA Impact! from 2004-2005.  NECW was to tape the debut broadcast for CSNNE on December 19, 2009, in Quincy, Massachusetts, but postponed the taping due to inclement weather.  The first 4 episodes were posted on NECW's website after technical issues forced the show's debut on CSNNE to be delayed until February 2010.

During that time, CSNNE informed NECW that due to a network obligation they could not live up to the originally contracted Friday afternoon time slot for the term of the contract. The show was moved by mutual agreement to airing as a weekly original program on the Comcast On Demand service throughout New England.

This was the first time a weekly pro wrestling show has been distributed in this manner and is another pioneering effort by NECW, similar to when NECW began offering weekly original wrestling programming via the Internet more than 5 years ago, long before there was a YouTube or a Hulu.

New England Championship Wrestling on Comcast On Demand aired 52 episodes in 2010, seen in a potential 2.2 million homes throughout portions of 5 of the 6 New England states.  The contract was not renewed at the end of 2010.  All of the 2010 programs can be viewed on NECW's Vimeo channel at http://www.vimeo.com/necw

Return
In March 2011, Sheldon Goldberg, on his radio show, announced that NECW would resume regular operations with an event in Carver, Massachusetts, on May 14, 2011.

On February 8, 2012, NECW announced that the promotion had joined the National Wrestling Alliance.  In October 2012, after a change in the ownership of the National Wrestling Alliance, NECW decided not to renew its membership in the NWA.

Broadcast TV
On February 20, 2013, New England Championship Wrestling announced plans to make their broadcast television debut on local station WMFP in approximately 2.3 million homes throughout the Greater Boston, Metro west, Blackstone Valley area as well as north into southern New Hampshire and the southernmost tip of Maine. Their 30-minute program began airing on the station Thursday nights at 12:30 a.m. starting April 4, 2013.

See also
List of National Wrestling Alliance territories
List of independent wrestling promotions in the United States

References

External links
 Official Website

Independent professional wrestling promotions based in Massachusetts
Independent professional wrestling promotions based in New England
National Wrestling Alliance members